Honey Creek Township is a township in Delaware County, Iowa, USA.  As of the 2000 census, its population was 1,060.

Geography
Honey Creek Township covers an area of 36.46 square miles (94.43 square kilometers). The stream of Routherford Branch runs through this township.

Cities and towns
 Edgewood (south half)

Edgewood is divided by Iowa Highway 3; the north half of the town is in Lodomillo Township, Clayton County.

Unincorporated towns
 Thorpe
 York
(This list is based on USGS data and may include former settlements.)

Adjacent townships
 Lodomillo Township, Clayton County (north)
 Elk Township, Clayton County (northeast)
 Elk Township (east)
 Oneida Township (southeast)
 Delaware Township (south)
 Coffins Grove Township (southwest)
 Richland Township (west)
 Cass Township, Clayton County (northwest)

Cemeteries
The township contains five cemeteries: Edgewood, Hutson, Roe, Saint Marks and Thorpe Union.

Major highways
  Iowa Highway 3
  Iowa Highway 13

References
 U.S. Board on Geographic Names (GNIS)
 United States Census Bureau cartographic boundary files

External links
 US-Counties.com
 City-Data.com

Townships in Delaware County, Iowa
Townships in Iowa